Kristian Hargreaves is a fictional character from the British Channel 4 soap opera Hollyoaks, played by Max Brown between 2002 and 2004.

Character development
Max Brown was cast into the role of Kristian in 2004. Brown came to producers attentions when he originally auditioned for the role of Jake Dean, which Kevin Sacre secured. Kristian was introduced as one of four new male characters introduced in late 2002. In 2003 Brown said he was content in staying with Hollyoaks for the foreseeable future. It 2004, it was reported that producers were considering axing the character along with several others.

Kristian is characterised as an "intelligent and charming student" who arrives in Hollyoaks to study molecular biology. Brown said that Kristian was enjoyable to play because he is "so big-headed and arrogant". He also said that Kristian has a "dark side" because there have been situations he has found himself in which left viewers feeling unsure. Also admitting he had wanted the programme to explore Kristian's past and hoped it would be "dark". The Shropshire Star describe Kristian as the serial's "heartthrob student".

In one storyline Kristian is involved in a potholing accident. The scenes were filmed on location in Snowdonia. A spokesperson for the serial described the scenes as "life and death situations". While in another, Kristian is paired with Lisa Hunter (Gemma Atkinson). Brown said it was a "steamy romance" which leads Kristian into trouble.

Storylines
Kristian arrives in Hollyoaks as a student studying molecular biology at Hollyoaks Community College. Kristian moves into Tony Hutchinson’s (Nick Pickard) student house, but when Tony decides to sell up, Kristian has to move to Nick O'Connor (Darren Bransford) and Jodie Nash's (Kate McEnery) flat. Kristian gains female attention from Izzy Cornwell (Elize du Toit), Becca Hayton (Ali Bastian), and Jodie.

Kristian organises a potholing trip, which ends in disaster when both Theo Sankofa (Andrew Somerville) and Jamie Nash (Stefan Booth) die. After recovering, Kristian enters a ‘Big Brother’ style reality show where he attracts many teenage girls, including Lisa. Soon, Lisa has a crush on him and Kristian begin to date her but makes her promise to keep it a secret. Kirstian realises Lisa is still a virgin. He then dumps her which leads to Lisa seducing Cameron Clark (Ben Gerrard) and losing her virginity to him. She then gets back with Kristian but Lisa’s brother, Dan Hunter (Andrew McNair), finds out about the two dating and warns Kristian off.

Failing to keep any women, Kristian feels lonely and found the company of Jodie as the pair end up sleeping together. This soon ends when Jodie leaves Hollyoaks because she fails her course. Kristian begins to have one-night stands, one such night with Mel Burton (Cassie Powney) leaves her hurt by the way he treats her. He dates Stacey Foxx (Jemma Keys), which turns into a nightmare as she is on his case 24/7 with an annoying laugh. Desperate to get rid of her, he tells Stacey that he is gay and in a relationship with Nick. Kristian then transfers to another university to get away from Stacy.

References

Hollyoaks characters
Television characters introduced in 2002
Male characters in television